Kids in America is the compilation album derived from the short-lived American reality television series American Juniors and released by Jive Records on September 9, 2003. It was performed by the 10 finalists on the show, not just the five who made it in.

Track listing

References

2003 debut albums
American Juniors albums
Jive Records albums